Volkan Kahraman (10 October 1979 – 8 February 2023) was an Austrian football player and manager.

Club career
Kahraman made his professional debut for Eredivisie side Feyenoord in November 1997 against De Graafschap and then scored 11 goals in 58 games on loan at city rivals Excelsior.

International career
Born in Austria, Kahraman was of Turkish descent. He played for the Austria national team three times in 2002.

Death
On 8 February 2023, Kahraman, aged 43, was shot and killed by his former friend, Orhan, in a murder-suicide after an argument broke out in Vienna, Austria.

Career statistics

References

External links
 
 OEFB Profile

1979 births
2023 deaths
Footballers from Vienna
Austrian people of Turkish descent
Association football midfielders
Austrian footballers
Austria youth international footballers
Austria international footballers
Feyenoord players
Excelsior Rotterdam players
Erzurumspor footballers
ASKÖ Pasching players
FK Austria Wien players
FC Red Bull Salzburg players
Iraklis Thessaloniki F.C. players
Xanthi F.C. players
LASK players
ASK Schwadorf players
SC Eisenstadt players
First Vienna FC players
Favoritner AC players
Eredivisie players
Eerste Divisie players
Austrian Football Bundesliga players
2. Liga (Austria) players
Süper Lig players
Super League Greece players
Austrian football managers
1. Simmeringer SC managers
Austrian expatriate footballers
Austrian expatriate sportspeople in the Netherlands
Expatriate footballers in the Netherlands
Austrian expatriate sportspeople in Greece
Expatriate footballers in Greece
People murdered in Austria
Murder–suicides in Europe
Deaths by firearm in Austria